Stop! Snyato! is the second studio album by Nu Virgos.

Track listing

Vocals
 Anna Sedokova
 Nadezhda Granovskaya
 Vera Brezhneva

Videos
2002 — Stop! Stop! Stop!2002 — Good Morning, papa!2003 — Ne ostavlyay menya, lubimiy2003 — Ubey moyu podrugu

Release history

Certifications

References

External links
 Official Website

2003 albums
Nu Virgos albums